Henry Draper (1837–1882) was an American doctor and astronomer.

Henry Draper may also refer to:

 Henry Draper Catalogue, an astronomical catalogue of stars
 Henry Draper Medal, an astrophysics prize awarded by the National Academy of Sciences of the USA
 Henry Draper Observatory, a historical museum in the United States 
 Draper (crater), a crater on the moon named after the US astronomer Henry Draper
 The Henry Draper system, a system of stellar classification
 Henry Draper (umpire) (1847–1896), British cricket umpire
 Morrell Henry Draper (1921–2005) British scientist

See also
 William Henry Draper (disambiguation)

Draper, Henry